The 1915 South Australian Football League season was the 39th season of the top-level Australian rules football competition in South Australia.

This was the last season of the SAFL as the competition was suspended due to the escalation of World War I. The competition would resume again in 1919.

Ladder

1915 SAFL Finals

Grand Final

References 

SAFL
South Australian National Football League seasons